Saint Jerome in Penitence or Penitent Saint Jerome is a c.1531 oil on canvas painting by Titian, now in the Louvre in Paris.

History 
The painting was first mentioned in the collections of Louis XIV and may have come from the Gonzaga collection, perhaps making it the Saint Jerome mentioned in Federico Gonzaga's correspondence, which can be dated to 1531. A second theory argues that the work was intended for Federico's mother Isabella d'Este, who wanted a nocturnal scene.

Sources
 Francesco Valcanover, L'opera completa di Tiziano, Rizzoli, Milano 1969.

External links
Louvre website

1531 paintings
Religious paintings by Titian
Paintings in the Louvre by Italian artists
Titian
Books in art
Lions in art